Ribnitz-Damgarten is an Amt in the district of Vorpommern-Rügen, in Mecklenburg-Vorpommern, Germany. The seat of the Amt is in Ribnitz-Damgarten.

The Amt Ribnitz-Damgarten consists of the following municipalities:
Ahrenshagen-Daskow
Ribnitz-Damgarten
Schlemmin
Semlow

Ämter in Mecklenburg-Western Pomerania